Marina Kunstmann Oettinger (11 May 1922 – 25 January 2016), better known as Marina de Navasal, was a Chilean journalist, television presenter, and radio announcer of German descent.

Biography
Marina Kunstmann Oettinger was the fourth daughter of Arturo Kunstmann Gerkens and Inés Oettinger. After marrying Spanish journalist , she began to sign with his surname. The couple had two children, Joaquín and Ximena, who both became journalists.

Marina de Navasal began her journalism career in 1945, at the newspaper Las Últimas Noticias, and later at El Mercurio de Santiago. She was also a columnist for the newspapers El Mercurio de Valparaíso and El Rancagüino. In 1955 she founded the news service , together with Alfredo Valdés Loma, Andrés Aburto, and her husband.

On television, she was a panelist for the Canal 13 program  (1974–2000) and announcer for Radio Prat, both together with her husband José María. On 29 July 1981 the Navasal/Kunstmann team provided live commentary for the marriage of Prince Charles and Diana Spencer for Canal 13.

In 1985 she won the Lenka Franulic Award, and in 1995 she and her husband received the Orbe Award.

Marina de Navasal was widowed in 1999, and died on 25 January 2016, at her home in Machalí.

References

1922 births
2016 deaths
Chilean journalists
Chilean people of German descent
Chilean television presenters
Chilean women journalists
People from Valdivia
Radio and television announcers
Chilean women television presenters